Preah Ko ("The Sacred Bull") was the first temple to be built in the ancient and now defunct city of Hariharalaya (in the area that today is called  Roluos), some 15 kilometers south-east of the main group of temples at Angkor, Cambodia. The temple was built under the Khmer King Indravarman I in 879 to honor members of the king's family, whom it places in relation with the Hindu deity Shiva.

Etymology
Preah Ko (Sacred Bull) derives its name from the three statues of sandstone located in the front of and facing the temple's central towers.  These statues represent Nandi, the white bull who serves as the mount of Shiva.

History

After the Khmer king Jayavarman II founded the Khmer empire in 802 A.D., he finally established his capital at Hariharalaya, where he died.  Indravarman I was the nephew of Jayavarman II. When he ascended to the throne, he ordered the construction first of Preah Ko, which was dedicated in 879, and later of the temple-mountain known as the Bakong. It is likely that this building program was made possible by the king's peaceful reign and his ability to draw income from the expanding empire. A restoration of the towers took place in early 1990s, financed by German government.

Site
Preah Ko consists of six brick towers arranged in two rows of three towers each perched on a sandstone platform. The towers face east, and the front central tower is the tallest. The sanctuaries are dedicated to three divinized forefathers of Indravarman and their respective wives. The front central tower is dedicated to Jayavarman II, the founder of the Khmer empire. The tower to the left is dedicated to Prithivindreshvara, King Indravarman's father; the tower to the right to Rudreshvara, his grandfather. The three rear towers are dedicated to the wives of these three men. The central towers all bear images of the Hindu god Shiva.

Gallery

See also

Legend of Preah Ko Preah Keo
Roluos (temples)
Angkor
Architecture of Cambodia
Hariharalaya
Bakong
Lolei

Footnotes

References

Angkorian sites in Siem Reap Province
Hindu temples in Siem Reap Province